Thout 23 - Coptic Calendar - Thout 25

The twenty-fourth day of the Coptic month of Thout, the first month of the Coptic year. On a common year, this day corresponds to September 21, of the Julian Calendar, and October 4, of the Gregorian Calendar. This day falls in the Coptic season of Akhet, the season of inundation.

Commemorations

Saints 

 The martyrdom of Saint Quadratus, one of the Seventy Disciples
 The departure of Saint Gregory the Theologian
 The departure of Saint Gregory the Monk

References 

Days of the Coptic calendar